Arthur Hawley Scribner (March 15, 1859 – July 3, 1932) was president of Charles Scribner's Sons.

Biography
He was born on March 15, 1859.

While at Princeton University he started the Ivy Club. He joined Charles Scribner's Sons in 1881. He later was president.

He died in Mount Kisco, New York, on July 3, 1932. He left $150,000 to Princeton University in his will.

References

1859 births
1932 deaths
Charles Scribner's Sons
Princeton University alumni